Marcia Ann Hutchinson MBE  (born 11 December 1962) is a British writer, publisher and politician.

Early life 

Marcia's father Irael Hutchinson, a foundry worker, came to the UK from Jamaica in 1958, her mother Olivia Hutchinson (née Roberson), a cook followed in 1959. They were both part of the Windrush Generation of post-war migrants to the UK. She is the seventh of nine children, seven girls and two boys. Her younger sister Yvonne Hutchinson, who died in 2015, was a noted housing campaigner in Bradford. Her four older siblings remained in Jamaica and her parents had five more children in Bradford in the 1960s. She grew up in Manningham, Bradford, a deprived area of the city. The family later moved to Newby Square, a notorious council estate which was demolished in 1987. Marcia's father died aged 56 when she was 14 and her mother struggled to bring up five children as a single parent.

Marcia attended Belle Vue Girl's Comprehensive School in Bradford. She was the first pupil from the school to be admitted to Oxford University attending Brasenose College from 1982 - 1985 reading jurisprudence. After attending the College of Law in Lancaster Gate, Marcia qualified as a solicitor in 1986 and worked for a number of firms specialising in Town and Country Planning, first In the City in London and then in Leeds.

Publisher 

After her two daughters were born Marcia changed careers and founded Primary Colours, a multicultural educational publishing and training company based in Huddersfield. The company operated between 1997 - 2014 publishing a range of books and teaching packs as well as delivering Theatre in Education, INSET training on diversity and cultural diversity projects in schools and other educational settings around the country. These included The Journey, a teaching pack based on the stories of Windrush Migrants to Yorkshire published to mark the 50th Anniversary of the Empire Windrush arriving in the UK, with a foreword written by Paul Boateng MP.

Going and Coming - a digital project and teaching pack which enabled children to record their family's migration stories, with a foreword written by Hilary Benn MP.

The Adventures of Ottobah Cugoano - which told the story of an enslaved boy brought to the UK who campaigned against slavery. The Foreword for the pack was written by then Minister for Culture David Lammy MP.

Did you Know? - A teaching pack documenting the contribution of Black and Asian asian people to the UK. The series was the brainchild of Headteacher Shazia Azhar MBE who became a director of Primary Colours and wrote a number of resources for the company.

Marcia was awarded an MBE in the Queens Birthday Honours list in 2010 for services to cultural diversity.

Political activity 

Her political activity began when aged seventeen during her year off between school and university when she was elected as the first woman committee member of the Bradford West Indian Community Centre Association. She moved to Manchester in 2012 and joined the Labour Party in 2016. In response to the underrepresentation of Black Councillors in the city (who in 2017 made up 12% of the population of the city but just 3% of councillors) she set up the Pipeline Project. Funded by a grant from the Labour Party National Executive Committee's Development Fund; the project aimed to support, mentor and train African Heritage People to become local councillors. Three of the first cohort of six Pipeline Project graduates were elected as local councillors in May 2021. Ekua Bayunu in Hulme, Nathaniel Tetteh in Eccles and Marcia herself in Ancoats and Beswick. In 2021 a record five Pipeline Project Alumni were accepted onto the Manchester Panel of Prospective Labour Candidates and Marcia was listed as a Black History Month Changemaker for her work. She campaigned for more green spaces in her ward and specifically five new parks along the lower River Medlock valley, which runs through the ward. She  opposed the idea of police officers in schools as saying they " bring institutionalised biases with them which mean that black pupils will be disproportionately sanctioned".

In September 2021 she criticized the Labour group whips, saying that there were no clear rules  and that they had a ‘ludicrously wide remit’ to decide what the rules were, when they are broken and subsequent punishments. Manchester Labour group secretary Pat Karney said he was personally disappointed that she ‘has not had the good manners to talk to me about her concerns’.  She said she resigned because of the "toxic culture" of the ruling Labour group on the council and that she had endured more racism and bullying in the past five years than the rest of her life.   She was signed off sick with depression but said she was continued to be targeted by the Labour group whips and that complaints about her were circulated to the whole Labour Group. Pat Karney said all of the allegations made by Marcia were found to be untrue – but he was 'sad to see her go'.

In May 2022 she appeared in The Guardian's Dining across the divide feature discussing attitudes to immigration and racism.

References

Councillors in Manchester
Labour Party (UK) councillors
21st-century British politicians
21st-century British women politicians
Black British women politicians
Members of the Order of the British Empire
1962 births
Living people